Jese Saukuru is a Fijian politician, and Cabinet Minister. He is a member of the People's Alliance.

Saukuru is from Naviyago village in Lautoka. Before entering politics he was a manager for Ba Provincial Holdings.

He was elected to the Parliament of Fiji as a SODELPA MP in the 2018 Fijian general election and appointed spokesperson for regional development and disaster management. He made his first speech in parliament on 29 November 2018.

In November 2022 once parliament had been dissolved for the 2022 election he resigned from SODELPA and joined the People's Alliance. He contested the election as a PA candidate and was elected with 2759 votes. On 24 December 2022 he was appointed Minister for Youths and Sports in the coalition government of Sitiveni Rabuka.

References

Living people
People from Ba Province
Social Democratic Liberal Party politicians
People's Alliance (Fiji) politicians
Members of the Parliament of Fiji
Sports ministers of Fiji
Year of birth missing (living people)